Pride Fest is a locally organized gay pride celebration held in Bismarck, North Dakota and Mandan, North Dakota. The three-day event is held in mid-summer, usually in a public park. The first Pride Fest was held in 2004.

Unlike other, larger pride events, the Pride Fest does not include a parade or other large-scale events, but continues the trend of smaller, more personal pride events in cities with noticeable, but not large, gay populations.

Individual events at the Pride Fest include karaoke, a dance, information booths, and a Pride Fest Program Event, featuring awards and entertainment. The Bismarck-Mandan Unitarian Universalist Fellowship was awarded the 2005 Pride Award.

See also
Pride parade
Sexuality and gender identity-based cultures

LGBT festivals in the United States
LGBT in North Dakota
Festivals in North Dakota
Bismarck–Mandan
Tourist attractions in Burleigh County, North Dakota
Tourist attractions in Morton County, North Dakota
Festivals established in 2004
2004 establishments in North Dakota